The Ripper is a British true crime docuseries directed by Jesse Vile and Ellena Wood, released on Netflix on 16 December 2020. The four-part miniseries recounts the events and investigation surrounding the murders of 13 women in West Yorkshire and Manchester, England between 1975 and 1980 by the serial killer Peter Sutcliffe. Journalists noted the similarities to the murders conducted by the notorious Jack the Ripper, and nicknamed the unknown perpetrator the Yorkshire Ripper. This series follows the chronology of events,  told through interviews with investigators, journalists, survivors and family members of victims.

Episodes

See also
 Peter Sutcliffe
 List of Netflix original programming

References

External links

2020 British television series debuts
2020 British television series endings
2020s British documentary television series
Documentary television series about crime
English-language Netflix original programming
Netflix original documentary television series
Television series about Jack the Ripper
Peter Sutcliffe